Danny Etzioni is a former Israeli footballer who is most famous for playing in Maccabi Netanya in the 1980s.

He now works as the general manager of Maccabi Herzliya youth team.

Honours
Israeli Premier League (1):
1982–83
League Cup (2):
1982–83, 1983–84
Israeli Supercup (1):
1983
UEFA Intertoto Cup (2):
1983, 1984
Israeli Second Division (1):
1992–93

References

1959 births
Living people
Israeli Jews
Israeli footballers
Maccabi Herzliya F.C. players
Maccabi Netanya F.C. players
Maccabi Yavne F.C. players
Hapoel Ramat Gan F.C. players
Israeli football managers
Maccabi Herzliya F.C. managers
Hapoel Herzliya F.C. managers
Association football midfielders